Rodrigue Gabriel Gilbert (July 1, 1941 – August 19, 2021) was a Canadian professional ice hockey forward who played his entire career for the New York Rangers of the National Hockey League (NHL). Known as "Mr. Ranger", he played right wing on the GAG line (Goal-A-Game line) with Vic Hadfield and Jean Ratelle but never with a Stanley Cup championship team. He was inducted into the Hockey Hall of Fame in 1982, and was the first player in Rangers history to have his number retired. After his playing career, he became president of the Rangers' alumni association.

Early life
Gilbert was born in Montreal on July 1, 1941, the son of Alma, a homemaker, and Gabriel Gilbert, a blacksmith.  He grew up a fan of the Montreal Canadiens.  He played three seasons for the Guelph Biltmore Mad Hatters of the Ontario Hockey Association from 1957 to 1960.  In his final year with the team, Gilbert slipped on some garbage strewn on the ice and fell back into the boards, breaking a vertebra in his back and temporarily paralyzing him. Corrective surgery went awry and led to hemorrhaging in his leg, and doctors feared amputation would be necessary, but Gilbert recovered.

Playing career
After finishing his junior career with the Guelph Royals, Gilbert joined the Rangers near the end of the 1960–61 NHL season.  He soon became popular with the Rangers' fans, and he rose in prominence as an NHL star. However, it was not without pain. In 1965–66, his career was nearly derailed when he went through a second spinal fusion operation. This surgery was performed by Dr. Kazuo Yanagisawa. Gilbert was out of action for half a season, but he bounced back in 1966–67 and scored 28 goals. On February 24, 1968, he scored four goals in a game against the Montreal Canadiens.  The Ratelle-Hadfield-Gilbert line, called the GAG line, proved formidable for years. He played with Team Canada in the 1972 Summit Series against the Soviet Union. He won the Bill Masterton Trophy in 1976 for his perseverance over his back troubles.

At the beginning of the 1977–78 NHL season, Gilbert and Rangers' General Manager John Ferguson got into a contract dispute. He would retire after the season, his eighteenth in the NHL. His number 7 was retired by the Rangers on October 14, 1979, the first number to be retired by the team.

Post-playing career
After retiring from professional hockey, he became head coach of the American Hockey League New Haven Nighthawks for the 1980-81 season.  Gilbert opened his own restaurant, 'Gilbert's,' on Third Avenue near 75th street in Manhattan.  He subsequently worked for Fundamental Brokers on Wall Street, assisting the company in opening a branch in his hometown of Montreal.  He returned to the Rangers organization in August 1989.  There, he acted as director of special projects and community relations representative, as well as president of its alumni association.  From 2017 onward, he made upward of 30 appearances a year on behalf of the Garden of Dreams Foundation, an outreach program that works with children in the community.

Personal life
Gilbert married Judith Christy in 1991, in a ceremony conducted by New York mayor David Dinkins.  Combined, they had four children together, Holly, Brooke, Chantal and Justin, and seven grandchildren.One of the grand children’s name is Owen. He was one of ten athletes who were featured in American artist Andy Warhol's 1979 Athlete Series of paintings, which featured prominent sports figures from the 1970s. Others in the series include O. J. Simpson, Chris Evert, and Pelé.

Gilbert died in Manhattan on August 19, 2021. He was 80 years old.

Career statistics
Sources:

Regular season and playoffs

International

Awards and honors
 Named to the NHL second All-Star team (1967–68)
 Named to the NHL first All-Star team (1971–72)
 Won Bill Masterton Trophy (1976)
 Won Lester Patrick Trophy (1991)
 Played in NHL All-Star Game (1964, 1965, 1967, 1969, 1970, 1972, 1975, 1977)
 Inducted into Hockey Hall of Fame in 1982
 Has his No. 7 retired at Madison Square Garden, the first Ranger to receive the honor.
 Awarded the Ellis Island Medal of Honor in May 2010, in recognition of his humanitarian efforts.

Records
New York Rangers team record for career goals (406)
New York Rangers team record for career points (1021)
New York Rangers team record for consecutive games with an assist by a forward (10)
Shares New York Rangers team record for assists in one game (5; three times)

See also
List of NHL players with 1000 points
List of NHL players with 1000 games played

References

Total Hockey (Second Edition), Editor - Dan Diamond, 
Hockey Stars of 1969 by Stan Fischler
Hockey '75 by Hal Bock

External links

Rod Gilbert's official web site (archived from 2005)

1941 births
2021 deaths
Bill Masterton Memorial Trophy winners
Canadian ice hockey right wingers
French Quebecers
Guelph Biltmore Mad Hatters players
Guelph Royals players
Hockey Hall of Fame inductees
Ice hockey people from Montreal
Lester Patrick Trophy recipients
National Hockey League players with retired numbers
New York Rangers players
Trois-Rivières Lions (EPHL) players
Canadian expatriate ice hockey players in the United States